Ahmadu Rufai was Sultan of Sokoto from 1867 to 1873. He succeeded Ahmad Bello who reigned for eleven months. Rufai's reign was distinguished for being peaceful.

Life
Rufai was a son of Uthman Dan Fodio. He spent most of his early life in a ribat at Silame on the frontiers of Argungu, an attack by the Kebbawa later drove him out of Silame but he stayed at the frontier in Tozo. He was likely selected Amir al-muminin  as a compromise between the claims of the sons of Muhammed Bello and Abu Bakr Atiku. During his tenure, he made peace with the Kebbawa who were a thorn on the sides of the Fulani by arranging a truce with the Sultan of Argungu, Abdullahi Toga. The truce recognized the independence of Kebbi and their rights to own the remaining lands the Kebbawa had recovered. His reign was noted as being uneventful in terms of campaigns and battles, there were few expeditions and raids but Sokoto's prosperity did not depend on raids anymore as long as Emirs sent their presents and share of booty and tax.

References

Sultans of Sokoto
19th-century Nigerian people
Dan Fodio family